Great Alaskan Railroad Journeys  is a BBC travel documentary series presented by Michael Portillo and aired on BBC Two. Portillo travels across the Alaska primarily by train, though at times using other forms of transportation where necessary. On his journeys, he makes stops to learn how places, events and people, and the railroads of the 19th century influenced the country's growth.

Episodes

Series 1 (2019)

Ninilchik to Carcross

References

External links
 
 

2019 British television series debuts
2019 British television series endings
2010s British documentary television series
2010s British travel television series
BBC television documentaries
BBC travel television series
Documentary television series about railway transport
English-language television shows
Television series by Fremantle (company)
Television shows set in the United States